The 2022 Copa América de Futsal will be an international futsal tournament to be held in Asunción, Paraguay from 29 January to 6 February 2021. The ten national teams involved in the tournament were required to register a squad of a minimum of 8 and up to 14 players, including at least two goalkeepers. Only players in these squads were eligible to take part in the tournament.

Each national team had to register its list of up to fourteen players in the COMET system and then submit it to CONMEBOL by 7 January 2022, 18:00 PYST (UTC−3) (Regulations Article 29). Teams are only permitted to make replacements in cases of serious injuries up to 48 hours before the start of the tournament (Regulations Article 31). Teams are also permitted to replace an injured goalkeeper with another at any time during the tournament (Regulations Article 32). In addition, any player with positive PCR tests for SARS-CoV-2 may be replaced at any moment before and during the tournament (Regulations Article 34). All the substitutions must have the approval of the CONMEBOL Medical Commission.

CONMEBOL published the lists of the 10 national teams on 14 January 2022.

The age listed for each player is as of 29 January 2022, the first day of the tournament. A flag is included for coaches who are of a different nationality than their own national team.

Group A

Brazil
Brazil announced a preliminary squad of 15 players on 10 January 2021. The final squad of 14 players was announced on 13 January 2022. Defender Rangel and winger Arthur were ruled out because they did not have the full doses of the COVID-19 vaccine, they were replaced by defender João Victor and goalkeeper Léo Gugiel respectively.

Head coach: Marquinhos Xavier

Uruguay
Uruguay announced a preliminary squad of 15 players on 27 December 2021. The final squad of 14 players was announced on 14 January 2022. Winger Yhordi Segui withdrew from the squad after testing positive for SARS-CoV-2 and was replaced by Luciano Cosentino on 26 January 2022.

Head coach: Gabriel de Simone

Colombia
Colombia announced a preliminary squad of 15 players on 13 December 2021. The final squad of 14 players was announced by CONMEBOL on 14 January 2022, and by the Colombian Football Federation on 27 January 2022.

Head coach: Roberto Bruno

Ecuador
Ecuador announced a preliminary squad of 15 players on 10 January 2022. The final squad of 14 players was announced by CONMEBOL on 14 January 2022, and by the Ecuadorian Football Federation on 25 January 2022 with the following changes: Erik Sarco, Haminton Villareal and Sindulfo Estacio were included in the squad replacing defender Bryan Salazar and wingers Nelson Bustos and Robert Román respectively.

Head coach: Darío Meza

Chile
Chile announced their final squad of 14 players on 7 January 2022. Wingers Frank Carrasco and Christian Palacios were replaced by Franco Luxardo and Nicolás Chacón.

Head coach:  Vicente De Luise

Group B

Argentina
Argentina announced a preliminary squad of 16 players on 15 December 2021. The final squad of 14 players was announced by CONMEBOL on 14 January 2021, and by the Argentine Football Association on 26 January 2022.

Head coach: Matías Lucuix

Paraguay
Paraguay announced a preliminary squad of 21 players on 3 November 2021. The final squad of 14 players was announced by CONMEBOL on 14 January 2022, and by Paraguayan Football Association on 28 January 2022 with Juan Manuel Benítez being included in the squad replacing winger Diego Poggi.

Head coach: Carlos Chilavert

Venezuela
Venezuela announced a preliminary squad of 20 players on 8 January 2022. The final squad of 14 players was announced by CONMEBOL on 14 January 2022, and by the Venezuelan Football Federation on 26 January 2022 with the following changes: defender Ángel Muñoz withdrew from the squad due to an injury (fracture of the left zygomatic arch), and pivot Enderson Suárez tested positive for SARS-CoV-2 and was replaced by Wilson Escalona, in addition, goalkepper Freddy Chacín and wingers Jackson Salazar and Alexander Moreno were included in the squad replacing goalkepper Keiverd Ortiz and defenders Keiber Quevedo and Ángel Muñoz respectively.

Head coach: Freddy González

Bolivia
Bolivia announced a preliminary squad of 27 players on 12 December 2021. The final squad of 14 players was announced on 14 January 2021. Winger Romario Tórrez and defender Roberto Guerrero were replaced by Miguel Padilla and Horacio Miranda respectively.

Head coach: Mauricio Arnez

Peru
Peru's final squad of 14 players was announced by CONMEBOL on 14 January 2022, and by the Peruvian Football Federation on 18 January 2022. Winger Angello Paipay was replaced by Jordi Rivera.

Head coach:  Francisco Castelo Branco

References

External links

2022 in futsal
Copa América de Futsal